is a Japanese football player. He plays for Phnom Penh Crown FC.

Career
Shuhei Mitsuhashi joined J3 League club Fukushima United FC in 2017.

Club statistics
Updated to 22 February 2018.

References

External links

Profile at Fukushima United FC

1994 births
Living people
Kanto Gakuin University alumni
Association football people from Kanagawa Prefecture
Japanese footballers
J3 League players
Fukushima United FC players
Association football midfielders
Expatriate footballers in Cambodia
Japanese expatriate sportspeople in Cambodia